January Thompson (born January 28, 1983) is an electronic artist, singer, composer, producer and performer.

Biography
January Thompson is the daughter of Stephen Thompson and classical pianist Deanna Thompson.

She now lives, writes, and records in-between her lake house in California and Brighton, England.

Career
Thompson was signed to Quango Records (Island) in 2009 and recorded her debut album, 'Careful What You Tell The Sky', in California with producers Ramin Sakurai and Bruno Guez.  It was released on Quango in 2010 in the United States and 11 European countries. In 2011 she wrote and recorded an EP in Nottingham England with Charles Webster called
"January Tuesday", which was released on Miso Records in the same year. Also in 2011 collaborations with Supreme Beings of Leisure and Carmen Rizzo on his album, "Looking Through Leaves", was released. In 2012 she had a single "Find My Way" released on Miso Records. In 2013 she had a single on London based producer "Little People" album and toured the US in the fall of 2013.  Thompson's next solo EP is being produced by London-based 'Little People' for a 2014 release.  She is also working with Bliss on a 2015 release.

Discography

Studio albums

Singles

References

External links 
 
 Allmusic Credits

Living people
1983 births